Since the first period of Latvian independence, Riga never had an official territorial division of the city that would be smaller than six administrative divisions, even though a division of Riga into 47 micro regions was initiated. The borders of the micro regions only partly coincide with the borders of the districts and suburbs, and common borders were only at an initial stage.

Historically, even smaller micro region divisions were used. An example would be Spilve, that consisted of Beķermuiža, Krēmeri, Voleri, Rātsupe and Liela muiža. The fact, that these smaller regions had no officially existing borders often created trouble as the interpretation of them among inhabitants and civil servants were quite different.

In 2008, the Riga City Council Development Agency began work on the new Riga regions, according to the new plan — definition of neighbourhoods. This plan is not yet officially confirmed, but when it is, Riga will consist of 58 neighbourhoods, each with its own centre, its own unique architectural form and landscape. However, they are not intended to be a form of administrative division.

Map of neighbourhoods in Riga

References